Novoye Lidzhe is a rural locality (a selo) in Araksky Selsoviet, Tabasaransky District, Republic of Dagestan, Russia. The population was 554 as of 2010. There are 7 streets.

Geography 
Novoye Lidzhe is located 8 km northeast of Khuchni (the district's administrative centre) by road. Arak is the nearest rural locality.

References 

Rural localities in Tabasaransky District